Condado or El Condado may refer to:

Places 
Brazil
 Condado, Pernambuco

Spain
 El Condado (Laviana), Asturias
 Condado de Treviño, Castile and León
 O Condado, Galicia

United States
 Condado (Santurce), Puerto Rico
 Condado Lagoon
 Condado Vanderbilt Hotel

People 

Cuitlahuac Condado Escamilla (born 1978), Mexican politician
Jeudiel Condado (born 1990), Venezuelan business administrator

Other uses 
 Condado (horse), a racehorse